49th parallel may refer to:

49th parallel north, a circle of latitude in the Northern Hemisphere
49th parallel south, a circle of latitude in the Southern Hemisphere
49th Parallel (film), a 1941 Canadian and British film
Canada–United States border, sometimes referred to as the "49th parallel" due to much of it following the 49th parallel north